Grabowa  is a village in the administrative district of Gmina Rychwał in Konin County, Greater Poland Voivodeship in west-central Poland.

References

Grabowa